The Very Best of Ram Jam is a compilation album by the American rock band Ram Jam.

The album compiles the band's two studio albums, Ram Jam and Portrait of the Artist as a Young Ram, though the latter's track listing is slightly altered.

Track listing

References

Ram Jam compilation albums
1990 greatest hits albums
Epic Records compilation albums